Bristol East is a constituency recreated in 1983 covering the eastern part of the City of Bristol, represented in the House of Commons of the UK Parliament since 2005 by Kerry McCarthy of the Labour Party.

Constituency profile
Bristol East covers Fishponds, St Anne's and Brislington.

History

First creation
The seat was first created in 1885. Boundaries were slightly altered in 1918 and Bristol East was abolished in a comprehensive review of the local seats for the 1950 general election.

Political history
The most powerful representative of Bristol East in Parliament and H.M. Government was Sir Stafford Cripps, MP (Lab) 1931–1950, who was Chancellor of the Exchequer from 1947 to 1950. The seat shifted from Liberal Party representation through to the Labour Party with the 1918-1923 period seeing a more centrist Liberal splinter group candidate elected.

Second creation
The seat was recreated in 1983 on much larger boundaries than before 1950, reflecting the lower occupation levels of the city centre and allocation of new seats elsewhere to reflect population expansion mainly in former rural and lightly populated suburban areas.

Political history
The 1983 election, the first in the recreated East seat, was a landslide victory for Margaret Thatcher's Conservatives following retention of the Falkland Islands in the Falklands War. Bristol East returned a Conservative MP, as Jonathan Sayeed defeated Tony Benn, the outgoing MP for Bristol South East and the leader of a large faction on the left-wing of the Labour Party.  In 1992 Labour's Jean Corston gained the seat from Sayeed, which has been retained by Labour candidates at each subsequent general election, the Conservatives coming second, except in 2005, when the Liberal Democrats did so.  The 2015 result gave the seat the 42nd-smallest majority of Labour's 232 seats by percentage of majority; however, in 2017, incumbent MP Kerry McCarthy more than tripled her majority, winning the largest share of the vote in the seat's history and by the biggest margin since 1997.

Turnout
Turnout has ranged between 80.3% in 1992 to 57.4% in 2001.

Other parties
Five parties' candidates achieved more than the deposit-retaining threshold of 5% of the vote in 2015. Liberal Democrat candidate Philip James won the largest third-party share of the vote to date, in the 2005 election — 25.2% of the vote.

Boundaries

1885–1918: The Municipal Borough of Bristol ward of South, part of North ward, and the local government district of St George.

1918–1950:  The County Borough of Bristol wards of St George East and St George West, and parts of Easton, and Somerset wards.

1983–1997: The City of Bristol wards of Brislington East, Brislington West, Easton, Eastville, Hengrove, Lawrence Hill, and Stockwood.

1997–2010: The City of Bristol wards of Brislington East, Brislington West, Easton, Eastville, Lawrence Hill, St George East, St George West, and Stockwood.

2010–present: The City of Bristol wards of Brislington East, Brislington West, Eastville, Frome Vale, Hillfields, St George East, St George West, and Stockwood.

The constituency covers the eastern part of the city of Bristol, from neighbourhoods of the City Centre to outer neighbourhoods (excluding surrounding settlements in local government administratively).

Members of Parliament

MPs 1885–1950

MPs 1983–present

Elections

Elections in the 2010s

Elections in the 2000s

Elections in the 1990s

Elections in the 1980s

Elections in the 1940s

Elections in the 1930s

Elections in the 1920s

Elections in the 1910s

Election results 1885-1918

Elections in the 1910s 
General Election 1914–15:
Another General Election was required to take place before the end of 1915. The political parties had been making preparations for an election to take place and by July 1914, the following candidates had been selected; 
Liberal: Charles Hobhouse
Unionist: Thomas Clarence Edward Goff
Independent Labour Party: Walter Ayles

Elections in the 1900s

Elections in the 1890s

Elections in the 1880s

See also
List of parliamentary constituencies in Avon

Notes

References

Sources
 British Parliamentary Election Results 1885–1918, compiled and edited by F.W.S. Craig (The Macmillan Press 1974)

External links
nomis Constituency Profile for Bristol East — presenting data from the ONS annual population survey and other official statistics.
Interviews with the 2005 parliamentary candidates

Constituencies of the Parliament of the United Kingdom established in 1885
Constituencies of the Parliament of the United Kingdom disestablished in 1950
Constituencies of the Parliament of the United Kingdom established in 1983
East